Buddy Tate and His Buddies is an album by saxophonist Buddy Tate which was recorded in New York City in 1973 and released on the Chiaroscuro label.

Reception

Scott Yanow of AllMusic states, "Jam sessions featuring swing veterans were not that common an occurrence on record during the early '70s, making Hank O'Neal's Chiaroscuro label both ahead of and behind the times. ... although falling short of being a classic, this infectious and consistently swinging music is worth picking up".

Track listing
 "Rockaway" (Buck Clayton) – 8:14
 "Medi 2" (Mary Lou Williams) – 6:11
 "Paris Nights" (Buddy Tate) – 7:35
 "When I'm Blue" (Tate) – 10:01
 "Sunday" (J. Fred Coots, Clifford Grey) – 11:01

Personnel
Buddy Tate – tenor saxophone
Roy Eldridge  – trumpet
Illinois Jacquet – tenor saxophone
Mary Lou Williams – piano
Steve Jordan – guitar
Milt Hinton – double bass
Gus Johnson – drums

References

Buddy Tate albums
1973 albums
Chiaroscuro Records albums